The 2013–14 Hertha BSC season was the 121st season in club history.

Background
Hertha won the 2012–13 2. Bundesliga, therefore securing promotion for the 2013–14 Bundesliga. The club's pre-season began on 23 June, with 500 fans showing up to the first pre-season training session.

For the season, Hertha signed Hajime Hosogai, Alexander Baumjohann, Sebastian Langkamp, and Johannes van den Bergh. Hertha also brought in on loan Per Ciljan Skjelbred and Tolga Ciğerci. Alfredo Morales, Marvin Knoll, Shervin Radjabali-Fardi, Daniel Beichler, Marco Djuricin, Roman Hubník all departed Hertha, while Felix Bastians was loaned out.

Transfers

In

Out

Bundesliga

Bundesliga review
Hertha began their Bundesliga campaign against Eintracht Frankfurt on 10 August. Hertha BSC won 6–1. Adrián Ramos, John Brooks, Sami Allagui and Ronny scored for Hertha; Ramos and Allagui scored two goals each. Alexander Meier scored for Eintracht. Hertha finished the matchday in first place. Hertha then faced 1. FC Nürnberg on 18 August on matchday two of the Bundesliga, with the match ending in a 2–2 draw. Allagui and Ronny scored for Hertha, while Josip Drmić and Hiroshi Kiyotake scored for Nürnberg. Hertha finished the matchday in sixth place. Hertha then faced Hamburger SV on matchday three, on 24 August, where Hertha won 1–0 through a Ramos goal. Hertha finished the matchday in fifth place. Hertha finished August with matchday four on 31 August against VfL Wolfsburg, falling 2–0 through Ivica Olić and Diego goals for Wolfsburg. Hertha ended August in sixth place.

Hertha BSC faced VfB Stuttgart on matchday five on 13 September. Stuttgart won 1–0 with a goal from Christian Gentner. Hertha finished the matchday in eighth place. Hertha played SC Freiburg on matchday six on 22 September; the match ended in a 1–1 draw. Per Ciljan Skjelbred scored for Hertha while Admir Mehmedi scored for Freiburg. Hertha finished the matchday in 10th place. Hertha finished September against Mainz 05 on matchday seven on 28 September; Hertha BSC won 3–1. Sami Allagui (2) and Änis Ben-Hatira scored for Hertha, while Nicolai Müller scored for Mainz. Hertha BSC finished September in fifth place.

Hertha started October with matchday eight against Hannover 96 on 4 October. The match ended in a 1–1 draw. Ronny scored for Hertha and Christian Schulz scored for Hannover. Hertha finished the matchday in sixth place. Hertha faced Borussia Mönchengladbach on matchday nine on 19 October. Hertha won 1–0 with a goal from Adrián Ramos. Hertha finished the matchday in fourth place. Hertha finished October against Bayern Munich on matchday 10 on 26 October. Bayern won 3–2. Ramos and Änis Ben-Hatira scored for Hertha. Mario Mandžukić (2) and Mario Götze scored for Bayern. Hertha finished October in fifth place.

Hertha started November against Schalke 04 on matchday 11 on 2 November, where Schalke won 2–0 through goals from Ádám Szalai and Julian Draxler. Hertha finished the matchday in seventh place. Hertha faced 1899 Hoffenheim on matchday 12 on 9 November. Hertha won 3–2. Ben-Hatira and Ramos (2) scored for Hertha Sejad Salihović scored two goals for Hoffenheim. Hertha finished the matchday in seventh place. Hertha faced Bayer Leverkusen on matchday 13 on 23 November. Bayer Leverkusen won 1–0 with a goal from Stefan Kießling. Hertha finished the matchday in seventh place. Hertha finished November against FC Augsburg on matchday 14 on 30 November.
The match ended in a 0–0 draw. Hertha finished November in seventh place.

Hertha started December against Eintracht Braunschweig on matchday 15 on 8 December. Hertha won 2–0 with goals from Adrián Ramos and Tolga Ciğerci. Hertha finished the matchday in seventh place. Hertha faced Werder Bremen on matchday 16 on 13 December. Hertha won 3–2. Ramos (2) and Ronny scored for Hertha, while Nils Petersen and Aaron Hunt scored for Bremen. Hertha finished the matchday in seventh place. Hertha finished December with matchday 17 against Borussia Dortmund on 21 December, winning 2–1. Ramos and Sami Allagui scored for Hertha. Marco Reus scored for Borussia Dortmund. Hertha finished December in sixth place. Hertha returned to competitive action with matchday 18 against Eintracht Frankfurt. Eintracht Frankfurt won 1–0 with a goal from Alexander Meier. Hertha finished the matchday in seventh place.

Bundesliga fixtures and results

Legend

League fixtures & results

League table

Results summary

DFB–Pokal

DFB–Pokal review
The draw for the first round of the DFB-Pokal occurred on 15 June. Hertha was drawn against VfR Neumünster. The match took place on 4 August and Hertha BSC won 3–2 in extra time. Änis Ben-Hatira (2) and Sami Allagui scored for Hertha. Harrer and Kramer scored for Neumünster. The draw for the second round of the DFB-Pokal occurred on 10 August. Hertha were drawn against 1. FC Kaiserslautern. The match took place on 25 September, where Kaiserslautern won 3–1, eliminating Hertha from the competition. Peter Niemeyer scored for Hertha, while Mohammadou Idrissou, Karim Matmour and Olivier Occéan scored for Kaiserslautern.

DFB–Pokal results

Legend

DFB–Pokal results

Player information

Squad

Squad statistics

Squad, appearances and goals

 

|-
|colspan="10"|Players who left the club during the 2013-14 season
|-

|}

Minutes played

Discipline

Notes

1.Kickoff time in Central European Time/Central European Summer Time.
2.Hertha BSC's goals first.

References

Hertha BSC
Hertha BSC seasons